The Principality of Seborga is an unrecognised micronation that claims a  area located in the northwestern Italian Province of Imperia in Liguria, near the French border, and about  from Monaco. The principality is coextensive with the town of Seborga; assertions of sovereignty were instigated in 1963 by a local campaigner based on unproven claims about territorial settlements made by the Congress of Vienna after the Napoleonic Wars.

History 

The claim of sovereignty for Seborga was put forward in 1963 by a Seborgan former flower grower named Giorgio Carbone. He claimed to have found documents from the Vatican archives which, according to Carbone, indicated that Seborga had never been a possession of the House of Savoy and was therefore not legitimately included in the Kingdom of Italy when it was formed in 1861 during Italian unification. Carbone claimed that Seborga had existed as a sovereign state of Italy since 954, and that from 1079 it was a principality of the Holy Roman Empire. Sovereignty claims assert that Seborga was overlooked by the Congress of Vienna in its redistribution of European territories after the Napoleonic Wars.

Carbone promoted the idea of Seborgan independence as a principality, and in 1963 the town's inhabitants elected him as their putative head of state. Carbone assumed the style and title His Tremendousness (Sua Tremendità) Giorgio I, Prince of Seborga. He formed a "cabinet" of ministers; minted a local currency, the luigino; introduced a Seborgan flag, a white cross on a blue background; and established a Latin motto,  (Sit in the shade). 
Carbone's campaign has generally not been taken seriously and is widely viewed as a ruse to attract tourists to the town, although his supporters in the town claim that their small state has been recognised by Burkina Faso.

Giorgio Carbone retained his ceremonial position until his death on 25 November 2009. The position of the Serborgan "monarch" is not hereditary, and since Carbone's death, elections have been held in Seborga every seven years among the town's 200 registered voters. Carbone was succeeded by businessman Marcello Menegatto, who was elected on 25 April 2010 and crowned on 22 May 2010 as His Serene Highness (Sua Altezza Serenissima or SAS) Prince Marcello I. Menegatto was re-elected as Prince on 23 April 2017, after an unsuccessful challenge to the position by Mark Dezzani, a British-born radio DJ who had lived in Seborga for nearly 40 years.

On 12 April 2019, Menegatto abdicated from his position, and he was succeeded by his ex-wife, Nina Menegatto, who was elected by the town as Her Serene Highness Princess Nina on 10 November 2019.

Pretenders to the "throne" of Seborga have included the self-styled "Princess" Yasmine von Hohenstaufen Anjou Plantagenet, and Nicolas Mutte, a French writer.

Seborga today 

Seborga's independence claims continue today, and an official Principato di Seborga website asserts the historical arguments put forward by Carbone. Seborga claims to maintain a volunteer border guard, the Corpo delle Guardie. Participants wear a blue-and-white uniform and during the tourist season they stand guard at sentry boxes on the unofficial border crossing on the main road into Seborga.

The unrecognised micronation that claims Seborga Town understands that the town still falls directly within the laws and borders of Italy.

Currency 

Seborga's local currency, the Seborga luigino, is divided into 100 centesimos. Luigini coins circulate in Seborga alongside the Euro, but no banknotes have been issued. The currency has no value outside of the town. The value of the luigino is pegged to the US dollar at SPL1= USD6.00.

Population 

As of 1 January 2018, Seborga had a population of 297 people, with 146 males and 151 females.

Flags

Notes

Bibliography

External links

  
 
  La Gazzetta di Seborga

Geography of Liguria
Principalities
Secessionist towns and cities
Micronations in Italy
Seborga
Self-proclaimed monarchy